This is a list destinations that Flair Airlines has operated to . It includes destinations served after the airline began scheduled flights in 2017 following the acquisition of Canadian travel company NewLeaf, but does not include or specify destinations served by charter flights that the airline mainly operated between 2005 and 2017. The Canadian low-cost carrier operates to these destinations with a fleet of Boeing 737 aircraft.

List

See also
NewLeaf

References

Lists of airline destinations